The Costa Rica national futsal team is controlled by the Costa Rican Football Federation, the governing body for futsal in Costa Rica and represents the country in international futsal competitions, such as the World Cup and the CONCACAF Championships.

Results and fixtures

The following is a list of match results in the last 12 months, as well as any future matches that have been scheduled.
Legend

2021

Competitive record

FIFA Futsal World Cup
1989 - did not qualify
1992 - 1st round
1996 - did not qualify
2000 - 1st round
2004 - did not qualify
2008 - did not qualify
2012 - 1st round
2016 - 2nd round
2021 - 1st round

CONCACAF Futsal Championship
1996 - 5th place
2000 -  Champions (host)
2004 -  3rd place (host)
2008 - 6th place
2012 -  Champions
2016 -  Champions (host)
2021 -  Champions

FIFUSA/AMF Futsal World Cup
1982 – 1st round
1985 – 1st round
1988 – did not enter
1991 – 1st round
1994 – did not enter
1997 – did not enter
2000 – 1st round
2003 – did not enter
2007 – did not enter
2011 – did not enter
2015 – did not enter
2019 – did not enter

Grand Prix de Futsal
2005 – did not enter
2006 – did not enter
2007 – did not enter
2008 – did not enter
2009 – 10th place
2010 – 12th place
2011 – 15th place
2013 – did not enter
2014 – 5th place
2015 – did not enter
2018 – 4th place

Futsal Mundialito
1994 – did not enter
1995 – did not enter
1996 – did not enter
1998 – did not enter
2001 – 1st round
2002 – did not enter
2006 – did not enter
2007 – did not enter
2008 – did not enter

Futsal at the Pan American Games
2007 – 4th place

References

External links
Official website

Costa Rica
National sports teams of Costa Rica
Futsal in Costa Rica